The BMI Foundation, Inc. is a non-profit organization founded in 1985 by executives of Broadcast Music Incorporated for the purpose of "encouraging the creation, performance and study of music through awards, scholarships, internships, grants, and commissions." Additionally, the Foundation makes grants annually to other not-for-profit musical organizations.  The organization is currently headed by Deirdre Chadwick who serves as the President and an elected Board of Directors.

Awards programs include:

BMI Student Composer Awards for Classical Compositions
Peermusic Latin Scholarships
Carlos Surinach Awards and Commissions
Woody Guthrie Fellowships
Women's Music Commission
John Lennon Scholarships
Milton Adolphus award
Charlie Parker Jazz Composition Prize
Jerry Harrington Musical Theater Award
Jerry Bock Musical Theater Award
Robert B. Sherman Scholarship
David N. Baker Jazz Composition Scholarship, Indiana University Jacobs School of Music

References

Music industry associations
Music organizations based in the United States